The Mayor of Quebec has been the highest elected official of the Quebec City government since the incorporation of the city in 1832.

List 

The following is a list of the mayors of Quebec City, Quebec, Canada.

|-
! colspan=2 | Name !! From !! To !! Duration !! Political party
|-
| 1 || Elzéar Bédard || May 1, 1833 || March 31, 1834 || 10 months and 30 days || N/A
|-
| 2 || René-Édouard Caron || March 31, 1834 || April 9, 1836 || 2 years and 9 days || N/A
|-
|  || René-Édouard Caron || August 15, 1840 || February 9, 1846 || 5 years and 179 days || N/A
|-
| 3 || George O'Kill Stuart || February 9, 1846 || February 11, 1850 || 4 years and 2 days || N/A
|-
| 4 || Narcisse-Fortunat Belleau || February 11, 1850 || February 14, 1853 || 3 years and 3 days || N/A
|-
| 5 || Ulric-Joseph Tessier || February 14, 1853 || February 13, 1854 || 364 days || N/A
|-
| 6 || Charles Joseph Alleyn || February 13, 1854 || February 12, 1855 || 364 days || N/A
|-
| 7 || Joseph Morrin || February 12, 1855 || January 22, 1856 || 323 days || N/A
|-
| 8 || Olivier Robitaille || January 22, 1856 || January 19, 1857 || 363 days || N/A
|-
| 9 || Joseph Morrin (second term) || January 19, 1857 || January 18, 1858 || 364 days || N/A
|-
| 10 || Sir Hector-Louis Langevin || January 19, 1858 || January 22, 1861 || 3 years and 3 days || N/A
|-
| 11 || Thomas Pope || January 22, 1861 || January 29, 1863 || 2 years and 7 days || N/A
|-
| 12 || Adolphe Guillet dit Tourangeau || July 3, 1863 || January 12, 1866 || 2 years and 6 months and 9 days || N/A
|-
| 13 || Joseph-Édouard Cauchon || January 12, 1866 || January 10, 1868 || 1 year and 11 months and 29 days || N/A
|-
| 14 || John Lemesurier || January 10, 1868 || November 12, 1869 || 1 year and 10 months and 2 days || N/A
|-
| 15 || William Hossak || November 12, 1869 || January 7, 1870 || 1 month and 25 days || N/A
|-
| 16 || Adolphe Guillet dit Tourangeau (second term) || January 10, 1870 || May 2, 1870 || 3 months and 23 days || N/A
|-
| 17 || Pierre Garneau || May 2, 1870 || May 4, 1874 || 4 years and 2 days || N/A
|-
| 18 || Owen Murphy || May 4, 1874 || May 6, 1878 || 4 years and 2 days || N/A
|-
| 19 || Robert Chambers || May 4, 1878 || May 3, 1880 || 1 year and 11 months and 30 days || N/A
|-
| 20 || Jean-Docile Brousseau || May 3, 1880 || May 1, 1882 || 1 year and 11 months and 29 days || N/A
|-
| 21 || Sir François-Charles-Stanislas Langelier || May 1, 1882 || March 1, 1890 || 7 years and 10 months || N/A
|-
| 22 || Jules-Joseph-Taschereau Frémont || March 1, 1890 || April 2, 1894 || 4 years and 1 month and 1 day || N/A
|-
| 23 || Simon-Napoléon Parent || April 2, 1894 || January 12, 1906 || 11 years and 9 months and 10 days || N/A
|-
| 24 || Georges Tanguay || January 12, 1906 || March 1, 1906 || 1 month and 20 days || N/A
|-
| 25 || Sir Jean-Georges Garneau || March 1, 1906 ||March 1, 1910  || 4 years || N/A
|-
| 26 || Olivier-Napoléon Drouin || March 1, 1910 || March 1, 1916 || 6 years || N/A
|-
| 27 || Henri-Edgar Lavigueur || March 1, 1916 || February 20, 1920 || 3 years and 11 months and 19 days || N/A
|-
| 28 || Joseph-Octave Samson || March 1, 1920 || March 1, 1926 || 6 years || N/A
|-
| 29 || Valmont Martin || March 1, 1926 || December 7, 1927 || 1 year and 9 months and 6 days || N/A
|-
| 30 || Télesphore Simard || December 7, 1927 || March 1, 1928 || 2 months and 25 days || N/A
|-
| 31 || Joseph-Oscar Auger || March 1, 1928 || March 1, 1930 || 2 years || N/A
|-
| 32 || Henri-Edgar Lavigueur (second term) || February 26, 1930 || January 26, 1934 || 3 years and 11 months || N/A
|-
| 33 || Joseph-Ernest Grégoire || March 1, 1934 || March 1, 1938 || 4 years || N/A
|-
| 34 || Lucien-Hubert Borne || March 1, 1938 || November 17, 1953 || 15 years and 8 months and 16 days || N/A
|-
| 35 || Wilfrid Hamel || December 15, 1953 || December 1, 1965 || 11 years and 11 months and 17 days || N/A
|-
| 36 || Gilles Lamontagne || December 1, 1965 || December 1, 1977 || 12 years || P.C.
|-
| 37 || Jean Pelletier || December 1, 1977 || November 5, 1989 || 11 years and 11 months and 4 days || P.C.
|-
| 38 || Jean-Paul L'Allier || November 5, 1989 ||November 19, 2005 || 16 years, 1 month and 26 days || R.P. (until 2001)R.M.Q. (after 2001)
|-
| 39 || Andrée Boucher || November 19, 2005 || August 24, 2007 || 1 year, 9 months and 18 days || Ind.
|-
| 40 || Jacques Joli-Coeur || August 24, 2007 || December 8, 2007 || 3 months and 14 days || R.M.Q.
|-
| 41 || Régis Labeaume || December 8, 2007 || November 14, 2021|| 13 years, 11 months, 6 days|| Ind. (2007-2009)
L'Équipe Labeaume (2009-2021)
|-
| 42 || Bruno Marchand || November 14, 2021|||||| Q.F.F
|-

Facts 
 The first woman mayor of Quebec City was elected in 2005, 180 years after the creation of the city. 
 Mayor Jean-Paul L'Allier has been the longest-serving mayor in the city's history, serving more than 16 years.
 The city was administered by a justice of the peace from 1836 to 1840.
 Party politics was introduced to city politics in the 1960s by Gilles Lamontagne's Progrès civique de Québec.

Legend 

N/A : Non applicable

P.C. : Progrès civique de Québec

Q.F.F : Québec forte et fière

R.P. : Rassemblement populaire

Ind. : Independent

R.M.Q. : Renouveau municipal de Québec

See also

 Quebec City Council

Footnotes

External links 
 

Quebec City